Beman Gates Dawes (January 14, 1870 – May 15, 1953) was a politician and oil executive who served two terms as a Republican Congressman from Ohio from 1905 to 1909.

Biography 
Dawes, a descendant of American Revolution hero William Dawes and the son of American Civil War Brevet Brigadier General Rufus R. Dawes, was born in Marietta, Ohio. Three brothers also gained international prominence in politics and business:  Charles G. Dawes, Rufus C. Dawes, and Henry May Dawes.

Beman attended the public schools of Marietta and  graduated from Marietta College with the Class of 1890. He married Bertie Burr on October 3, 1894. Dawes engaged in agriculture and engineering, and became interested in public utilities. He was President of The Ohio River Bridge & Ferry Company in 1903 when the Williamstown–Marietta Bridge was constructed. He served in the U.S. House of Representatives from Ohio's 15th District from 1905 to 1909, the Fifty-ninth and Sixtieth United States Congresses.  After his retirement from Congress, Dawes became interested in the production of oil and the building of electric railways.  Along with his wife, he founded the Dawes Arboretum, an endowed institution dedicated to the education of youth.  In 1914, he was elected president and chairman of the board of directors of the Pure Oil Company.

Death
Beman Gates Dawes died in Newark, Ohio.  His body was entombed in a mausoleum at the Dawes Arboretum.

References
 Retrieved on 2008-12-29

1870 births
1903 deaths
Politicians from Marietta, Ohio
People from Newark, Ohio
Marietta College alumni
19th-century American politicians
Dawes family
Republican Party members of the United States House of Representatives from Ohio